¡No me toques las palmas que me conozco! is María Isabel's first album and was released in 2004.

Track listing 
"Antes muerta que sencilla"
"La vida es bella"
"Un muchacho"
"¡No me toques las palmas que me conozco!
"Mi limusín"
"La noche y tu voz"
"Escalofrío"
"La pepa"
"¿Onde vas Marisabel?"
"Mira Niño"

2004 albums
María Isabel albums